Star Township may refer to:

 Star Township, Coffey County, Kansas
 Star Township, Antrim County, Michigan
 Star Township, Pennington County, Minnesota
 Star Township, Montgomery County, North Carolina, in Montgomery County, North Carolina
 Star Township, Bowman County, North Dakota, in Bowman County, North Dakota
 Star Township, Clay County, South Dakota, in Clay County, South Dakota

Township name disambiguation pages